Events in the year 1955 in the Republic of India.

Incumbents

Federal government
 President of India – Rajendra Prasad
 Prime Minister of India – Jawaharlal Nehru
 Vice President of India – Sarvepalli Radhakrishnan
 Chief Justice of India – Bijan Kumar Mukherjea

Governors
 Andhra Pradesh – Chandulal Madhavlal Trivedi
 Assam – Jairamdas Daulatram
 Bihar – R. R. Diwakar
 Maharashtra – Harekrushna Mahatab (starting 2 March)
 Odisha – P. S. Kumaraswamy Raja 
 Punjab – Chandeshwar Prasad Narayan Singh 
 Rajasthan – Maharaj Man Singh II
 Uttar Pradesh – Kanhaiyalal Maneklal Munshi 
 West Bengal – Harendra Coomar Mookerjee

Events
 National income - 111,748 million
 The Imperial Bank of India, the oldest (est. 1921) and the largest commercial bank of the Indian subcontinent, was transformed into the State Bank of India.

Law
 The Hindu Marriage Act

Births
5 January – Mamata Banerjee, politician
27 January – Ratnottama Sengupta, film journalist
7 March – Anupam Kher, actor
3 April – Hariharan, playback singer
11 April – Rohini Hattangadi, actress.
2 May – Maharaj Krishan Kaushik, field hockey player and coach. (died 2021)
11 May –  Keshav Desiraju, civil servant (died 2021)
24 May – Rajesh Roshan, music director.
22 August  Chiranjeevi Konidela, actor.
25 August – Khan Shein Kunwar, short story writer.
17 October – Smita Patil, actress (died 1986).
5 November – Karan Thapar, television commentator and interviewer.
8 November – Pandula Ravindra Babu, politician and member of parliament from Amalapuram.
29 November –  Rajendrasinh Jadeja, cricketer (died 2021)
1 December – Udit Narayan, playback singer
12 December – Chandan Mitra, journalist (died 2021)
13 December – Manohar Parrikar, politician and Chief Minister of Goa. (died 2019)

Deaths
1 January – Shanti Swaroop Bhatnagar, scientist (born 1894).
Nobel death day 10 December 1955

See also 
 List of Bollywood films of 1955

 
India
Years of the 20th century in India